Bua loi or bua loy (literally: "floating water lily") is a Thai dessert. It consists of rice flour rolled into small balls, and cooked in coconut milk and sugar. Some Bua loi also adds sweet egg into the recipe. It was inspired by Tangyuan, a Chinese dessert that is traditionally eaten around the Lantern festival. Bua Loi also traditionally eats at the Dongzhi Festival in Thailand, which is festival for the Chinese-Thai bloodline. There are a variety of versions of Bua loi such as using food coloring instead of natural color, using soy milk instead of Coconut cream, sliced Pumpkin to add inside rice balls, et cetera. There's other type of Bua loi in other country from China, Japan, Indonesia, Myanmar, Philippines, and Southern Vietnam. 1 cup of Bua Loy has total calories of 295.5 kilocalories, protein of 10.4 grams, carbohydrate of 6.3 grams, and fat of 25 grams.

History 
There're Thai foods that inspiration and adapt from other country. Some of Thai foods inspiration from Portugal, and Chinese. The origin of Bua loi is around the Ayutthaya period by Maria Guyomar de Pinha or Thao Thong Kip Ma. Her father Fanik Guyomar from the Portuguese colony of Goa, was a Bengali Christian of mixed Portuguese and Japanese descent. Her mother was a Japanese and Portuguese named Ursula Yamada, whose family had emigrated to Thailand following the repression of Christianity in Japan during King Naresuan the Great period. In 1682, Maria married Constantine Phaulkon after he abandoned Anglicanism for Catholicism to show his sincerity. They had two sons, George "Jorge" Phaulkon and Constantin "João" Phaulkon, and lived a life of affluence as Phaulkon rose to become highly influential at the royal court of king Narai. During her government service as head of royal utensils caretaker who supervise royal utensils, she taught dessert cooking to Thai people, such as  Thong Yip (pinched gold egg yolks), Thong Yot (gold egg-yolks drops), and Foi Thong (in Portuguese called Fios de ovos mean "egg threads"). The first types of dessert were Kaikob, Nokprow, Ai Tue, and Bua Loi (At that time, the Bua Loi recipe used popped rice instead of Glutinous rice flour ).

In the King Narai period, Chinese peoples evacuate to Thailand to trade and work. And that includes working in cuisine for the palace. From the record, Bua Loi is inspired by Tang Yuan. When peanut was brought from the Philippines and white/black sesame entered China from Central Asia during the Han era, Bua Loi or "Tang Yuan" had a variety of fillings. The black sesame paste in ginger juice or Bua Loi in ginger broth is the most well-liked.

In King Rama I period, in the memo of Krom Luang Narintharathewi, wrote about the Celebration of the Emerald Buddha in 1809. During the festival, There're sweet decks for 2000 monks with are Chicken filling dessert, Foi Thong, Khanom Phing, Kluai Khaek, Rhum, Lhateang, Sangkhaya, and dessert in Kap Ho Khlong Hae boat to the sweet savory dishes poem. It is a royal poem wrote by Rama I praising desserts such as Khao Niao Sangkhaya, Lam Chiak dessert, Thong Yip, Bua Loi, et cetera. 

Around the Chulalongkorn period, the time Thai cuisine recipes began to be published and officially recorded. Mae Khrua Hua Pa was the first Thai cookbook published by Lady Plian Phasakorawong. This cookbook is about a Thai tray of food recipes for monks, and the tray recipe also includes Bua loi's recipe.

Bua Loi is a Thai dessert used with pairs on auspicious ceremonies, make merit or festivals.

Dongzhi Festival 

Dongzhi Festival, or Chinese Winter Solstice Festival, is a festival to mark the Winter Solstice – the day of the year with the shortest daylight (known as the shortest day). Traditionally, the holiday is celebrated around the 22nd of December each year. Each year, it is the last festival for Thais of Chinese descent. This festival usually cooks Bua Loi to pay respect to the guardian spirit for helping the family to have a smooth life throughout the year and pray for family safety. For the Dongzhi Festival, incense burners, red candles, incense, fruits, tea, and Bua Loi are used for worship.

Yuan Xiao Festival 

People in Thailand refer to "元宵节" as the "Yuan Xiao Festival" or the "Lantern Festival." Chinese people place high importance on this holiday. According to the lunar calendar, a full moon first appears after the Chinese New Year. It symbolizes the end of New Year's festivities. Chinese people enjoy eating the Bua Loy dessert on that day because they think it will bring wealth to their families and themselves. They also went outside to view lanterns displayed along streets. There are a large number of Chinese Thai people in Thailand. When there are significant Chinese holidays, they frequently gather together to celebrate. Another important celebration is Yuan Xiao Festival. Chinatown (Yaowarat) in Bangkok and Chinese-Thai communities around the country celebrate the Yuan Xiao Festival yearly by preserving old Chinese traditions.

Recipe 
For Bua Loi Ingredients, there're 3 parts of ingredients.

Variety Recipe 
Nowadays, Bua Loi can make with additional components or change some ingredients. Here are some examples of other Bua Loi recipes.

 use food coloring instead of natural color.
 using Tapioca Starch with glutinous rice flour.
 Add black sesame cream.
 using soy milk instead of Coconut cream, and coconut milk.
 Sliced Pumpkin to add inside rice balls.
 Add coconut meat.

Instruction

Instructions for rice balls 

 For red color balls, blanch beetroot in boiled water for 15-20 minutes to get the red water.
 For yellow color balls, steam pumpkin around 15 to 20 minutes. Mash it and mix together with glutinous rice flour.
 For blue color balls, soak butterfly pea flowers in warm water and squeeze the blue water out of the flowers.
 For green color balls, pound or blend the pandan leaves. Then add water and squeeze the green water out of the leaves.
 Combine the colorful water to glutinous rice flour.
 Boil the rice balls until perfectly cooked. When it's cooked, the balls will rise to top of pot.

Instructions for sweet egg 

 Boiling ginger water with sugar gets poured.
 Wait three to five minutes after cracking the egg. Then rest it.

Instructions for coconut milk 

 Boil coconut milk with pandan leaves on low heat. Then add sugar, palm sugar and salt. Stir well and wait until it boils.
 Put colorful rice balls into a bowl, followed by sweet egg and coconut milk. Then it's ready to be served.

Other Countries 
In other countries, There also have the dessert that are similar to Bua Loi. For an example:

China 

Tang yuan, or sweet soup balls, are created with water and glutinous rice flour. Glutinous rice balls can be filled with various sweet ingredients, including sesame seeds, peanuts, lotus seed paste, and sweet red bean paste (Anko). More people are filling them with inventive flavors like durian, chocolate, and taro paste. They can be deep-fried or cooked in water or syrup.

Japan 
Mochigome, or short-grain glutinous rice, is used to make mochi or Japanese rice cake. The rice is cooked first, then mashed and pounded. They are beautiful round buns made of chewy, soft rice. For many years, rice cake has been regarded as an essential celebration meal for the New Year. Japanese people can often consume mochi in a variety of forms. This is traditionally made in Japan at a ceremony known as "Mochitsuki." Make a powder out of glutinous rice by grinding it with water. This method was known as wet milling. Today, glutinous rice flour is used in most rice cakes with bean paste available in stores. Mochi powder has made it possible to produce it fast, with consistent quality, and at any time.

Indonesia 
An Indonesian version of Tangyuan, a Chinese glutinous rice ball served in a hot broth or syrup, is called Wedang Ronde. Wedang is the Javanese word for beverage, and Ronde is a Dutch word for the round. The round, sugar- and the crushed peanut-filled ball are composed of glutinous rice flour. The method used to create the ball is similar to creating the Klepon. The sticky balls are served in a sweet ginger soup made with pandan leaves, fresh ginger, and palm sugar.

Myanmar 

The traditional Burmese sweet snack known as mont lone yay paw, or round snack on the water, is made from a mixture of glutinous rice flour, rice flour, water, and salt. Smooth balls made from the mixture filling with palm jaggery or palm sugar. The rice balls used in this dish get their name from their tendency to float to the top of the boiling water or coconut milk in which they are cooked once they are finished. The rice dumplings are typically served on a banana leaf while still warm and often sprinkled with desiccated or shredded coconut. The traditional time to make Mont Lone Yay Paw is during festive occasions like Myanmar New Year (also known as Thingyan or Water Festival), when groups of friends, neighbors, and family members come together to roll batch of rice balls and cook them in a large pot of boiling water over an open fire.

Philippines 

Ginataang Bilo-bilo with Langka is a Filipino snack dish. It makes of ripe jackfruit, coconut cream, sugar, sago pearls, and glutinous rice balls (known as bilo-bilo in the local language). Some people see this as a condensed form of the Ginataang halo-halo.

Southern Vietnam 

Chè trôi nc is a Vietnamese dessert made of glutinous rice balls filled with mung beans and served with coconut sauce, toasted sesame seeds, and warm ginger syrup.

Nutrition 
When cooked, 1 cup of Bua Loy has total calories of 295.5 kilocalories, protein of 10.4 g., carbohydrate of 6.3 g., and fat of 25 g.

See also
 List of Thai desserts
 Thong Yip
 Thong Yot
 Maria Guyomar de Pinha

References 

Thai desserts and snacks
Glutinous rice dishes